Story Teller (sold as Story Time in Australia and New Zealand. In Italy Story Teller 1 was sold as I Raccontastorie while Story Teller 2 as C'era una volta) was a magazine partwork published by Marshall Cavendish between 1982 and 1985.

Publishing history

The original collection
The original Story Teller was released from December 1982 and throughout 1983 as a fortnightly partwork. Each magazine contained a selection of children's stories, some traditional folk tales like "Anansi the Spiderman", some children's tales such as Gobbolino, the Witch's Cat, and some contemporary works written especially for the series, like "Timbertwig". Most issues contained a poem or two, as well. The stories were accompanied by lavish colour artwork, and inside each issue was an offer to purchase custom made binders for the magazine as well as cases to hold the tapes.

Each issue of Story Teller came with a cover-mounted cassette tape containing a reading of the stories, complete with music and sound effects. What set Story Teller apart from other partworks was the stories were read by professional actors and celebrities of the time, including Richard Briers, Sheila Hancock, Derek Jacobi, and Nigel Lambert.

Two distinguishing features of the audio cassettes were the "Story Teller" jingle that introduced and ended each tape and the characteristic "ping" that sounded when the time came to turn the pages to encourage children to read along.  The "Story Teller" jingle is an existing track called "Children's Carnival" by Ted Atking and Alain Feanch.

Longer stories were split over multiple issues to encourage parents to buy the next issue. These were referred to as Story Teller Serials. As one serial came to end, another would start. Many of these would be simple two-part stories, but a selection of stories (usually well-known ones such as Peter Pan and the Wizard of Oz) were spread over several issues. Pinocchio was the longest serial, with seven installments.

The original collection was 26 issues long with each tape lasting up to 45 minutes. An exception was issue 26, which was 90 minutes long because it also contained the special preview issue for Story Teller 2, which immediately followed the original series.

(The New Zealand and Australian Story Time only ran for 1 series, so the final Issue 26 was the standard 45 minutes long and did not feature the special preview for the next series. This was the sole difference between its UK counterpart; the cassettes and artwork were otherwise identical. Similarly, the cassette carry case was available in Australia. However, in New Zealand, a smaller box was provided, made out of cardboard wrapped in a red plastic with small domes at the corners joining it all together and a piece of Velcro for the flap on the top).

Storyteller 2
Story Teller 2, which was previewed in issue 26 of the original Story Teller series in the UK, continued the tradition of the original by combining traditional and contemporary children's stories. (In New Zealand and Australia, Story Time only ran for 1 series.)

Little Story Teller
When Story Teller 2 ended, Marshall Cavendish followed it up with another 26-part series, Little Story Teller, which, as its title suggests, was aimed at a younger audience than the original series. Many of the stories in Little Story Teller featured the adventures of the inhabitants of the Magic Mountain, which included Leroy the Lion, Dotty the Dragon, and Morris and Doris the hamsters.

Christmas specials
Three Christmas specials were also published. Released annually along with each series, the Christmas Story Tellers featured festive stories and even songs. The third Christmas Story Teller included stories suited to both the original series and Little Story Teller. Of the Christmas specials only Christmas Story 2 was made available in New Zealand or Australia, under the title of Christmas Story Time.

Story Teller Song Book
Christmas Story 3 was widely assumed to be the last title from the Story Teller series but in 1986, Marshall Cavendish released the Story Teller Song Book. The 52-page publication contained 20 all-time sing-along favourites rather than stories but it still retained the Story Teller tradition of featuring colouring and activity pages as well as an accompanying cassette tape.

My Big Book of Fairy Tales
In 1987, Marshall Cavendish revisited the world of Story Teller by publishing a big hardback book called My Big Book of Fairy Tales. Although the publication lacked the Story Teller branding, it was essentially a compilation of the best stories from Story Teller; it contained 73 stories from the two series and three Christmas issues. The original text and illustrations were used, except for the story "The Frog Prince", which featured new artwork (for no apparent reason). The book was rereleased in 1989 with a different cover and again in 1994. Unlike the partwork, My Big Book of Fairy Tales was not accompanied by a cassette.

Story Teller: Members' Edition 
Published online in December 2020, this was a special edition of Story Teller, created by members of the Story Teller Facebook Group and some of the original writers and artists of the original Story Teller. It is available online at stme.uk.

Availability
The partwork is now regarded as highly collectible, and issues can still be found today in secondhand and charity shops, but finding a complete set can be very difficult. Digital copies can also be found on auction sites such as eBay, but these are of dubious legality.

Stories and readers

Story Teller 1

Part 1

 Gobbolino, the Witch's Cat: Sheila Hancock
 The Hare and the Tortoise: Bernard Cribbins
 The Shoe Tree: Sheila Hancock
 The Emperor's New Clothes: Bernard Cribbins
 The Red Nightcaps: Marise Hepworth
 Aldo in Arcadia (1): Nigel Lambert & John Brewer
 The Forest Troll: Nigel Lambert

Part 2

 The Elves & the Shoemaker: Brian Blessed
 Master Tiger: Nigel Lambert
 Aldo in Arcadia (2): Nigel Lambert, John Brewer & John Green
 The Last Slice of Rainbow: Sheila Hancock
 Gobbolino the Ship's Cat: Sheila Hancock
 The Greedy Fox: Brian Blessed
 Sinbad & the Valley of Diamonds: Brian Blessed
 Bring on the Clowns: Nigel Lambert

Part 3

 The Great Big Hairy Boggart: Dermot Crowley
 The Owl and the Pussycat: Susannah York
 Gobbolino the Knight's Cat: Sheila Hancock
 The Lion & the Mouse: Dermot Crowley
 Simon's Canal: Susannah York
 Hansel and Gretel: Susannah York
 Aldo in Arcadia (3): Robert Powell, Susannah York, Nigel Lambert & John Brewer
 Child of the Sun: Dermot Crowley

Part 4

 Narana's Strange Journey: Roy Hudd
 Rhubarb Ted: Nigel Lambert
 Gobbolino the Kitchen Cat: Sheila Hancock
 Noisy Neighbours: Nigel Lambert
 Jester Minute (Part 1): Nigel Lambert
 The Princess & the Pea: Tina Jones
 The Ant and the Grasshopper: Marian Hepworth
 Santa's Early Christmas: Roy Hudd

Part 5

 Timbertwig: George Layton
 The Fox and the Crow: Hayley Mills
 Drummerboy & the Gypsy: George Layton
 Rapunzel: Hayley Mills
 Virgil's Big Mistake: Nigel Lambert
 Jester Minute (Part 2): Nigel Lambert
 'O Here It Is: Hayley Mills

Part 6

 Beauty and the Beast: Hywel Bennett
 Dodo & the Pot of Gold: Patricia Brake
 Timbertwig & the Caravan of Surprises: George Layton
 The Flying Piggy-Bank: Patricia Brake
 The Land of the Bumbley Boo: Patricia Brake
 The Moon and the Millpond: Dick Vosburgh
 The Friendly Bear: Hywel Bennett

Part 7

 The Billy Goats Gruff: Nigel Pegram
 The Snow Queen: Liza Goddard
 A Pocketful of Trouble: Nigel Pegram
 Little Spook of Spook Hall: Liza Goddard
 The Silly Tortoise: Nigel Pegram
 Timbertwig Gets a New Hat: George Layton
 Faster than Fairies: Liza Goddard

Part 8

 Dot & the Kangaroo (Part 1: Dot Loses Her Way): Carole Boyd
 Oliphaunt: Joss Ackland
 The Goose that Laid the Golden Egg: Carole Boyd
 The Selfish Giant: Joss Ackland
 Jester Minute & the Vanishing castle (1): Nigel Lambert
 The Creation of Man: Joss Ackland
 Boffy & The Teacher Eater: Nigel Lambert

Part 9

 Abdulla and the Genie: Nigel Lambert
 Dot & the Kangaroo (Part 2): Carole Boyd
 Jester Minute and the Vanishing Castle (2): Nigel Lambert
 The Boy Who Cried Wolf: Robert Powell
 Neville Toogood: Carole Boyd
 The Pied Piper of Hamelin: Robert Powell

Part 10

 Gulliver's Travels (Part 1): Joanna Lumley
 Dot & the Kangaroo (Part 3): Carole Boyd
 Mike's Bike (Part 1): Mick Ford
 The Three Wishes: Carole Boyd
 David and Goliath: Mick Ford
 The Enchanted Horse: Joanna Lumley
 Mr. Tom Narrow: Carole Boyd

Part 11

 Gulliver's Travels (Part 2): Joanna Lumley
 Pinocchio (Part 1): Ian Lavender
 The Dog and the Bone: David Graham
 Sleeping Beauty: Joanna Lumley
 Walter Spaggot: Nigel Lambert
 Growling at Tigers: David Graham
 Mike's Bike (Part 2): Mick Ford

Part 12

 The Mighty Prince: Una Stubbs
 Ford's Toy Cars (Part 1): George Layton
 Drummerboy Races for his Life: George Layton
 First Flight: Ian Lavender
 The Town Mouse & the Country Mouse: Una Stubbs
 Pinocchio (Part 2): Ian Lavender
 The Gingerbread Man: Una Stubbs

Part 13

 The Tinder Box: Siân Phillips
 Ford's Toy Cars (Part 2): George Layton
 Warrior Girl: Floella Benjamin
 Pinocchio (Part 3): Ian Lavender
 Three Bald Spots: Carole Boyd
 The Ugly Duckling: Siân Phillips

Part 14

 The Monster in the Labyrinth: Dermot Crowley
 Who's Stronger?: Diana Rigg
 Pinocchio (Part 4): Ian Lavender
 The Old Man of Torbay: Diana Rigg
 Scarlet Braces: Dermot Crowley
 Grogre the Ogre (Part 1): Nigel Lambert
 Cinderella: Diana Rigg

Part 15

 Pandora's Box: Morag Hood
 A Fishy Tale: Morag Hood
 Pinocchio (Part 5): Ian Lavender
 Grogre the Ogre (Part 2): Nigel Lambert
 The Parasol: Kay Parks
 The Flying Jacket: Lionel Jeffries
 The Three Little Pigs: Lionel Jeffries

Part 16

 Sam's Big Break: Tommy Eytle
 The Mango-Seller: Judy Geeson
 Hen-Hustler Kluk: Tommy Eytle
 Puss in Boots: Judy Geeson
 Grogre the Ogre (Part 3): Nigel Lambert
 Pinocchio (Part 6): Ian Lavender

Part 17

 William Tell: Tom Baker
 I Saw a Ship a-Sailing: Carole Boyd
 Pinocchio (Part 7): Ian Lavender
 Anansi and the Fancy Dress Party: Tom Baker
 Jojo's Jigsaw Puzzle: Carole Boyd
 Can You Keep a Secret?: Carole Boyd
 The Lion and the Peacock: Tom Baker

Part 18

 Heidi (Part 1): Denise Bryer
 Father William: Steven Pacey
 George and the Dragon: Steven Pacey
 The Frog Prince: Gemma Craven
 Bubble and Squeek: Steven Pacey
 No Mules: Gemma Craven

Part 19

 Jack & the Beanstalk: Brian Blessed
 Why the Giraffe Can't Speak: Carole Boyd
 Sinbad and the Amazing Islands: Brian Blessed
 The Book of Beasts (Part 1): John Baddeley
 Car Attack: Carole Boyd
 Heidi (Part 2): Denise Bryer
 Hedge's Problem Tree: Carole Boyd

Part 20

 Rumpelstiltskin: Hayley Mills
 Heidi (Part 3): Denise Bryer
 The Green Maiden of the Lake: Hayley Mills
 The Book of Beasts (Part 2): John Baddeley
 It Makes a Change: Denise Bryer
 Lutra the Otter: Michael Tudor Barnes

Part 21

 The Bold Little Tailor: Michael Hordern
 The Wolf in Sheep's Clothing: Nigel Lambert
 Wiser than the Czar: Michael Hordern
 Bobbie and the Magic Go-Cart: Nigel Lambert
 Heidi (Part 4): Denise Bryer
 The Mighty Rabbit: Nigel Lambert

Part 22

 Waldorf's Fantastic Trip (Part 1): Gay Soper
 The Midas Touch: Joanna Lumley
 A Meal with a Magician: George Layton
 Eleven Wild Swans: Joanna Lumley
 Timbertwig Catches a Marrow: George Layton
 The Human Fly from Bendigo: Joanna Lumley

Part 23

 Timbertwig's Birthday: George Layton
 Waldorf's Fantastic Trip (Part 2): Gay Soper
 Goldilocks: Annette Crosbie
 Dad and the Cat and the Tree: David Ashford
 The Faery Flag: Annette Crosbie
 The Runaway Piano: David Ashford
 The Little Red Hen: Annette Crosbie

Part 24

 I Wish, I Wish: Carole Boyd
 Counting Chickens: Carole Boyd
 A Hedgehog Learns to Fly: John Brewer, John Green and Steven Pacey
 The Little Tin Soldier: Ian Holm
 Kingdom of the Seals: Ian Holm
 Aldo in Arcadia (4): Steven Pacey, Nigel Lambert, John Green & John Brewer

Part 25

 Little Red Riding Hood: Denise Bryer
 The Happy Prince: Tim Curry
 Aldo in Arcadia (5): John Brewer, Tina Jones, Nigel Lambert & Steven Pacey
 Mr Miacca: Denise Bryer
 The Great Pie Contest: Steven Pacey
 Stolen Thunder: Tim Curry

Part 26

 The Goblin Rat: Liza Goddard
 Thumbelina: Liza Goddard
 Where Can an Elephant Hide?: Steven Pacey
 A Lion at School: Liza Goddard
 Captain Bones: Dermot Crowley
 Aldo in Arcadia (6): John Brewer, Tina Jones, Nigel Lambert & Steven Pacey

Part 26 Story Teller 2 Special Preview Issue

 The Wind in the Willows: Michael Jayston
 Jack-in-the-Box: Steven Pacey
 Campbell the Travelling Cat: Una Stubbs
 Arthur the Lazy Ant: Steven Pacey
 Dragon Child: Una Stubbs
 The Magic Porridge Pot: Steven Pacey
 The Lobster Quadrille: Una Stubbs

Story Teller 2

Part 1

 The Wizard of Oz : Miriam Margolyes
 The Creatures with Beautiful Eyes : Martin Shaw
 The Circus Animal's Strike : David Tate
 Yushkin the Watchmaker : Martin Shaw
 Rumbles in the Jungles (1) : David Tate
 The Dancing Fairies : Miriam Margolyes
 There Once Was a Puffin : Martin Shaw

Part 2

 The Magic of Funky Monkey : Gemma Craven
 The Snake and the Rose : Gemma Craven
 Rumbles in the Jungles (2) : David Tate
 The Wizard of Oz: In The Forest : Miriam Margolyes
 The Wind in the Willows: The Wild Wood : Michael Jayston
 The Troll : Gemma Craven

Part 3

 The Musicians Of Bremen : Nigel Hawthorne
 Little Joe and the Sea Dragon : Dermot Crowley
 The Lord of the Rushie River (1) : Denise Bryer
 The Wizard of Oz: The Emerald City : Miriam Margolyes
 Party in the Sky : Nigel Hawthorne
 Kebeg : Denise Bryer
 The Song of the Engine : Nigel Hawthorne

Part 4

 Shorty the Satellite and the Lost Rocket : Nigel Lambert
 The Wizard of Oz: Quest for the Wicked Witch : Miriam Margolyes
 Petrushka : Janet Suzman
 The Garden : Nigel Lambert
 Master of the Lake : Janet Suzman
 The Lord of the Rushie River (2) : Denise Bryer
 Riloby-rill : Janet Suzman

Part 5

 The Snow Bear : Derek Jacobi
 The Inn of Donkeys : Derek Jacobi
 Shorty the Satellite and the Brigadier : Nigel Lambert
 The Nightingale : Derek Jacobi
 Hugo and the Man Who Stole Colours : Nigel Lambert
 The Wizard of Oz: A Great And Terrible Humbug : Miriam Margolyes
 Recipe : Nigel Lambert

Part 6

 Gobbolino and the Little Wooden Horse (1) : Sheila Hancock
 The Wizard of Oz: The Final Journey : Miriam Margolyes
 The Farmer, the Tomt and the Troll : Carole Boyd
 Shorty The Satellite And The Shooting Star : Nigel Lambert
 The Fishing Stone : Carole Boyd
 Silly Old Baboon : Nigel Lambert

Part 7

 Traveller Ned : Morag Hood
 Gobbolino and the Little Wooden Horse (2) : Sheila Hancock
 Little Bear And The Beaver : Ian Lavender
 The Ju-Ju Man : Floella Benjamin
 A Song for Slug : Ian Lavender
 Larkspur Gets Her Wings : Morag Hood
 Windy Nights : Ian Lavender

Part 8

 The Most Beautiful House : Robin Nedwell
 Gobbolino and the Little Wooden Horse (3) : Sheila Hancock
 The Orchestra That Lost Its Voice : Steven Pacey
 Stone Soup : Debbie Arnold
 The Man Who Knew Better : Robin Nedwell
 How the Polar Bear Became : Debbie Arnold
 The Marrog : Steven Pacey

Part 9

 Diggersaurs (1) : Steven Pacey
 Molly Whuppie : Eve Karpf
 Young Kate : Eve Karpf
 Upside-Down Willie (1) : Steven Pacey
 Gobbolino and the Little Wooden Horse (4) : Sheila Hancock
 Meeting : Eve Karpf

Part 10

 Toad of Toad Hall (1) : Richard Briers
 Simeom the Sorcerer's Son (1) : George Layton
 Anansi and the Python : Ysanne Churchman
 Stone Drum : Ysanne Churchman
 Upside-Down Willie (2) : Steven Pacey
 Gobbolino and the Little Wooden Horse (5) : Sheila Hancock
 Hannibal : George Layton

Part 11

 Grogre the Golden Ogre (1) : Nigel Lambert
 Anya's Garden : Carole Boyd
 Miss Priscilla's Secret : Carole Boyd
 Simeom the Sorcerer's Son (2) : George Layton
 The Tortoises' Picnic : David Adams
 Toad of Toad Hall (2) : Richard Briers
 Big Gumbo : Carole Boyd

Part 12

 Box of Robbers : Patricia Hodge
 The Challenging Bull : Nigel Lambert
 Barney's Winter Present : Antonia Swinson
 Toad of Toad Hall (3) : Richard Briers
 Minnie the Floating Witch : Patricia Hodge
 Grogre the Golden Ogre (2) : Nigel Lambert
 An Eskimo Baby : Patricia Hodge

Part 13

 Brer Rabbit and the Tar-Baby : Dick Vosburgh
 Geordie's Mermaid : Susan Jameson
 Grogre the Golden Ogre (3) : Nigel Lambert
 Gatecrashers : Susan Jameson
 Toad of Toad Hall (4) : Richard Briers
 The Princess Who Met the North Wind : Susan Jameson

Part 14

 Peter Pan (1) : Derek Jacobi
 The Scrubs and the Dubs (1) : Windsor Davies
 Horace's Vanishing Trick : Gay Soper
 The Tumbledown Boy : Gay Soper
 The Horn Flute : John Shrapnel
 King Ferdinand's Fancy Socks : Gay Soper
 The Flower Seller : John Shrapnel

Part 15

 Peter Pan (2) : Derek Jacobi
 Cath's Cradle : Una Stubbs
 The Scrubs and the Dubs (2) : Windsor Davies
 Willow Pattern : Anthony Jackson
 Gary the Greatest : Anthony Jackson
 Campbell Finds a Castle : Una Stubbs
 A Child's Thought : Una Stubbs

Part 16

 The Thin King and the Fat Cook : Patricia Brake
 Peter Pan (3) : Derek Jacobi
 Bored Brenda : Patricia Brake
 The Swords of King Arthur : Mick Ford
 Touching Silver : Patricia Brake
 Noggin and the Birds : Oliver Postgate
 Goblin Market : Mick Ford

Part 17

 Longtooth's Tale (1) : Steven Pacey
 Shubiki's Hat : Eva Haddon
 Big Red Head (1) : Ruth Madoc
 The Tree that Sang : Steven Pacey
 Too Many Buns for Rosie : Eva Haddon
 Peter Pan (4) : Derek Jacobi
 The Moon : Eva Haddon

Part 18

 Longtooth's Tale (2) : Steven Pacey
 Galldora and the Woods-Beyond : Eve Karpf
 Big Red Head (2) : Ruth Madoc
 At the Forge : James Bryce
 Mouse in the Snow : Eve Karpf
 Peter Pan (5) : Derek Jacobi
 I Had a Little Nut-Tree : James Bryce

Part 19

 Alice's Adventures in Wonderland (1) : Patricia Hodge
 Wonder Wellies : Nigel Lambert
 Peter and the Mountainy Men : Carole Boyd
 The Treachery of Morgan : Mick Ford
 Pat's Piano : Carole Boyd
 Danger in the Reeds : Nigel Lambert
 My Uncle Paul of Pimlico : Nigel Lambert

Part 20

 Arthur Gives Back His Sword : Mick Ford
 Butterflies on the Moon : Geoffrey Matthews
 Ginger's Secret Weapons : Cass Allen
 Alice's Adventures in Wonderland (2) : Patricia Hodge
 A Great Escape : Cass Allen
 The Miller and His Donkey : Geoffrey Matthews
 Sheep-Dog : Geoffrey Matthews

Part 21

 Never Tangle With aA Tengu : Christopher Timothy
 Diggersaurs (2) : Steven Pacey
 Nothing Like a Bath : Denise Bryer
 Alice's Adventures in Wonderland (3) : Patricia Hodge
 The Neat and Tidy Kitchen : Denise Bryer
 Tommy's Shadow : Steven Pacey
 My Mother Said : Denise Bryer

Part 22

 Quest of the Brave : Martin Jarvis
 The Captain's Horse : Martin Jarvis
 Alice's Adventures in Wonderland (4) : Patricia Hodge
 The City of Lost Submarines (1) : David Tate
 Nogbad Comes Back : Oliver Postgate
 Ostriches Can't Fly : Joanna Wake
 The Cottage : Joanna Wake

Part 23

 Cyril Snorkel - The Performing Beast : Denise Bryer
 Dorrie and the Witch's Visit : Denise Bryer
 What the Smoke Said : George Layton
 Alice's Adventures in Wonderland (5) : Patricia Hodge
 The City of Lost Submarines (2) : David Tate
 Simon Rhymon : George Layton
 The Sunlight Falls Upon the Grass : Denise Bryer

Part 24

 Harlequin and Columbine (1) : Leonard Rossiter
 The City of Lost Submarines (3) : David Tate
 The Kind Scarecrow : Maureen O'Brien
 Seadna and The Devil : Anthony Jackson
 The Birthday Candle : Maureen O'Brien
 Superbabe : Anthony Jackson
 Upon My Golden Backbone : Maureen O'Brien

Part 25

 It Takes Time to Teach a King : Dermot Crowley
 Harlequin And Columbine (2) : Leonard Rossiter
 Cabbage and the Foxes : Carole Boyd
 The Donkey Who Fetched the Sea : Dermot Crowley
 Give It to Zico! (1) : Ian Lavender
 The Electric Imps : Carole Boyd
 If You Should Meet a Crocodile : Carole Boyd

Part 26

 The Mermaid Who Couldn't Swim : Maureen O'Brien
 Give It to Zico! (2) : Ian Lavender
 Mandy and the Space Race : Maureen O'Brien
 Somewhere Safe : Maureen O'Brien
 Noggin and the Money : Oliver Postgate
 Harlequin and Columbine (3) : Leonard Rossiter

Christmas Story Teller

Part 1

 Bertie's Escapade : Bernard Cribbins
 The Chocolate Soldier : Carole Boyd
 Timbertwig's Christmas Tree : George Layton
 King John's Christmas : Nigel Lambert
 Snow White and the seven Dwarfs : Liza Goddard
 Boo Ho Ho! : Bernard Cribbins
 What Wanda Wanted : Carole Boyd
 Aladdin and his Magic Lamp : George Layton
 The Great Sleigh Robbery : Nigel Lambert
 The First Christmas : Liza Goddard

Part 2

 Gobbolino's Christmas Adventure : Sheila Hancock
 Shorty and the Starship : Nigel Lambert
 Mole's Winter Welcome : Richard Briers
 Santa's Sunny Christmas : Miriam Margolyes
 Good King Wenceslas : Sheila Hancock
 Dick Whittington and His Cat : Richard Briers
 The Tale of the Little Pine Tree : Miriam Margolyes
 The Fairies' Cake : Miriam Margolyes
 Grogre and the Giant Nasher : Nigel Lambert
 A Christmas Carol : Joss Ackland

Part 3

Readers and singers: Derek Griffiths, Carole Boyd, Denise Bryer, Nigel Lambert, Steven Pacey, Claire Hamill, Tom Newman.
 Jingle Bells
 A Carol for Gobbolino
 Leroy Learns to Skate
 Snow
 Snow Song
 Mother Goose
 Christmas Fun
 Rudolph to the Rescue
 Away in a Manger
 I Saw Three Ships Come Sailing By
 Dotty and the Teddy Bears
 Clara and the Nutcracker Doll
 O Little Town of Bethlehem
 The Surprise Christmas
 The Forgotten Toys
 Minnie's Dinner Spell
 Morris's Christmas Stocking
 Hurray for Christmas!

Story Teller: Members' Edition 

 Timbertwig and the Dancing Dress: Peet Ellison
 The Peacock and the Magpie: Caroline Usasz
 Pip the Water Drop: Jo Huysamen
 The Cloud Cook: Rebecca Harrison
 How Night Came: Fiona Botham
 The Twelve Dancing Princesses: Michael Sharmon
 Bubble & Squeek: Deborah Breen
 Zebra or Giraffe?: Chris Signore
 Friendship in the Park: Jo Huysamen
 The Battle of the Crabs: Antonio Pineda
 Odysseus: Nicola Ni Craith
 Lawton the Lion: Kathy Schmidt-Trajkovski

In other languages
 Dutch "Luister Sprookjes en Vertellingen"
 German "Erzähl mir was"
 French "Raconte-moi des histoires"
 Italian "I Racconta Storie" and "C'era una volta" (re-edited with CDs instead of cassette tapes)
 Greek "Άμπρα Κατάμπρα" (Abracadabra) (re-edited 2007 with CDs instead of cassette tapes)
 Spanish "Cuenta Cuentos"
 Afrikaans "Storieman"

Similar partworks

Story Teller became such a huge success in the 80s that other publishers released similar partworks, including Fabbri's Once Upon a Time collection and Disney's Storytime series. In addition to "clones" of the Story Teller series, several paperback books containing selections from the actual Story Teller series were released (with accompanying cassettes) in the US, under the title "Look, Listen and Read". These compilations contained stories or themes that related to each other, either by author or content. Examples include The Best of Aesop, The Legend of King Arthur, Jack and the Beanstalk, and Rapunzel.

Disney's Storytime
The main differentiator between Story Teller and Disney's Storytime was the fact that the latter featured only Disney characters. Storytime hit newsagents' shelves soon after Story Teller proved to be a bestseller. It was published in 24 parts and customised binders and cassette boxes were produced to house the collection (just like Story Teller). Disney movies, such as Snow White and the Seven Dwarfs (1937) and Sleeping Beauty (1959), were serialised. (Note: the Australian and New Zealand versions of Story Teller were published as Story Time - not to be confused with Disney's Storytime series.)

Part 1
Snow White and the Seven Dwarfs (Part 1) : Penelope Keith
Donald Duck Goes Climbing : John Alderton
The Three Little Pigs : John Alderton
Pooh and Piglet Have an Adventure : Paul Daneman
Old King Cole : John Alderton

Part 2
The Grasshopper and the Ants : Ray Brooks
Christopher Robin and His Friends Go for a Picnic : Paul Daneman
Snow White and the Seven Dwarfs (Part 2) : Penelope Keith
Pluto on the Trail : Ray Brooks
Toad's Hot Air Balloon : Ruth Madoc
Little Boy Blue : Ray Brooks

Part 3
The Murky, Misty Day : Paul Daneman
The Country Cousin : Ruth Madoc
King of the Jungle : Paul Daneman
Donald Duck's Picnic : Ray Brooks
Snow White and the Seven Dwarfs (Part 3) : Penelope Keith
Old Mother Hubbard : Ruth Madoc

Part 4
The Wise Little Hen : Ruth Madoc
Piglet's Honey Expedition : Paul Daneman
Dumbo Plays Cricket : Richard Briers
Mickey Mouse Goes Camping : Julia McKenzie
Snow White and the Seven Dwarfs (Part 4) : Penelope Keith
There Was a Crooked Man : Julia McKenzie

Part 5
Christopher Robin Plans a Surprise : Paul Daneman
The Aristocats : Julia McKenzie
The Rabbit with Big Feet : Paul Daneman
Donald in Trouble : Julia McKenzie
Robin Hood (Part 1) : Richard Briers
There Was an Old Woman : Julia McKenzie

Part 6
Bambi Grows Up : Una Stubbs
Pooh Has a Surprise : Paul Daneman
Robin Hood (Part 2) : Richard Briers
Pluto Plays Guard Dog : Wendy Craig
Paintbrush Tails : Julia McKenzie
Three Blind Mice : Julia McKenzie

Part 7
Robin Hood (Part 3) : Richard Briers
Merlin's Magic : Julia McKenzie
Donald's Dream Cottage : Julia McKenzie
The Ugly Duckling : Julia McKenzie
Pooh Knits a Jumper : Paul Daneman
I Had a Little Nut Tree : Julia McKenzie

Part 8
Mowgli Meets Baloo : Freddie Jones
Roo Paints His Masterpiece : Paul Daneman
Uncle Scrooge and His Hedgehog Brooms : Julia McKenzie
Policeman Goofy : Julia McKenzie
Robin Hood (Part 4) : Richard Briers
Pat-a-Cake Pat-a-Cake : Adele Spencer

Part 9
The Fox and the Hound : Wendy Craig
Custard or Mustard? : Anton Rodgers
Donald's Disastrous Day : Anton Rodgers
Dumbo the Elephant (Part 1) : Una Stubbs
Pancakes Can Be Dangerous Things : Paul Daneman
Hey Diddle Diddle : Adele Spencer

Part 10
 Dumbo the Elephant (Part 2): Una Stubbs
 Pooh Does Some Roo-Sitting: Paul Daneman
 Toad, the Bargain Hunter: Anton Rodgers
 Mickey and Donald Go Fishing: Andrew Sachs
 Sleeping Beauty and the Evil Fairy's Spell: June Whitfield
 Jack Sprat: Anton Rodgers

Part 11
Sleeping Beauty and Her Prince : June Whitfield
Pooh, the 'Poler' Bear : Paul Daneman
Pluto's Pigeon Pie : Anton Rodgers
Donald Joins the Army : Anton Rodgers
Dumbo the Elephant (Part 3) : Una Stubbs
Ride a Cock Horse : June Whitfield

Part 12
Pinocchio at the Puppet Theatre : Andrew Sachs
Mickey and Donald Go to a Wedding : Una Stubbs
Dopey's Heavy Boots : Andrew Sachs
Pooh's Busy Day : Paul Daneman
The Rescuers : Una Stubbs
Mary, Mary Quite Contrary : Una Stubbs

Part 13
Lady Leaves Home : June Whitfield
Piglet-in-the-Middle : Paul Daneman
Pinocchio on Pleasure Island : Andrew Sachs
Donald the Brave : Sheila Steafel
Thumper to the Rescue : Una Stubbs
Hickory Dickory Dock : June Whitfield

Part 14
Pinocchio Inside the Whale : Andrew Sachs
Mickey's New Sweater : Una Stubbs
Robin and the Golden Axe : Freddie Jones
Tigger's Accident : Paul Daneman
The Adventures of Mowgli : Freddie Jones
Pussy Cat, Pussy Cat : June Whitfield

Part 15
Cinderella and the Ugly Sisters : Penelope Keith
Piglet Gets Bigger : Paul Daneman
Bambi, King of the Forest : Una Stubbs
Donald and the Drummer Boys : Paul Daneman
The Christmas Tree : Penelope Keith
Little Miss Muffet : June Whitfield

Part 16
Cinderella Goes to the Ball : Penelope Keith
O'Malley's Breakfast : June Whitfield
A Stormy Time in the Wood : Paul Daneman
All the Fun of the Fair : June Whitfield
The Adventures of Beer Rabbit : Freddie Jones
Hush-a-Bye Baby : June Whitfield

Part 17
The Mad Hatter's Tea Party : June Whitfield
Donald's Winter Holiday : June Whitfield
Goofy's Birthday Bloomer : Bernard Cribbins
Cinderella and the Glass Slipper : Penelope Keith
Pooh and the Wishing Well : Paul Daneman
This Little Pig : June Whitfield

Part 18
Arthur Meets Merlin the Magician : Bernard Cribbins
Pluto's Bone : Angela Thorne
Uncle Scrooge's Morning Dip : June Whitfield
What Could Be Worse Than a Woozle : Paul Daneman
Mowgli and King Louie : Freddie Jones
Baa Baa Black Sheep : June Whitfield

Part 19
Pooh Keeps Fit : Paul Daneman
101 Dalmatians Escape : Angela Thorne
The Grand Sale : Angela Thorne
Donald's Wet Afternoon : Angela Thorne
Merlin and Madam Mim : Bernard Cribbins
One, Two, Three, Four, Five : June Whitfield

Part 20
 The Sword in the Stone: Bernard Cribbins
 Mickey's Musical Robot: Nerys Hughes
 The Sticky Story of the Practical Pig: Nerys Hughes
 The Easter Egg Hunt: Paul Daneman
 Mary Poppins Comes to Stay: Nerys Hughes
 Sing a Song of Sixpence: Nerys Hughes

Part 21
Peter Pan and Wendy : Martin Jarvis
Donald's New Toy : June Whitfield
Uncle Scrooge's Crystal : Nerys Hughes
Pooh's Rapid Recovery : Paul Daneman
Lady in Disgrace : June Whitfield
Monday's Child : Nerys Hughes

Part 22
Peter Pan to the Rescue : Martin Jarvis
Mickey and Minnie Go On Holiday : Andrew Sachs
Sleepy Saves the Day : June Whitfield
Tigger Loses His Bounce : Paul Daneman
Alice and the Queen of Hearts : June Whitfield
Goosey, Goosey, Gander : Andrew Sachs

Part 23
Captain Hook's Revenge : Martin Jarvis
Rabbit's Play : Paul Daneman
Noises in the Night : Andrew Sachs
Donald Duck: Super Salesman : Nerys Hughes
101 Dalmatians on the Run : Andrew Sachs
The Queen of Hearts : Nerys Hughes

Part 24
Peter Pan Against the Pirates : Martin Jarvis
Mickey's Circus : Nerys Hughes
Pinocchio Makes a House : Andrew Sachs
Pooh and Piglet Go Camping : Paul Daneman
The Magical Mary Poppins : Nerys Hughes
Girls and Boys Come Out to Play : Nerys Hughes

References

External links
There are three dedicated websites:
The Magical World of Story Teller
Story Teller Yahoo! Group

Children's magazines published in Australia
Defunct magazines published in Australia
Magazines established in 1982
Magazines disestablished in 1985
Partworks
1982 establishments in Australia
1985 disestablishments in Australia